International Inuit Day, also known as International Circumpolar Inuit Day, is a holiday that was created to celebrate Inuit and amplify their voices. It falls on November 7.

References

Inuit
International observances
November observances

External links
Press Release about Inuit Day from the Inuit Circumpolar Council (ICC).